Gitta Kutyniok (born 1972) is a German applied mathematician known for her research in harmonic analysis, deep learning, compressed sensing, and image processing. She has a Bavarian AI Chair for "Mathematical Foundations of Artificial Intelligence" in the institute of mathematics at the Ludwig Maximilian University of Munich.

Education and career
Kutyniok was educated in Detmold, and in 1996 earned a diploma in mathematics and computer science at University of Paderborn. She then completed her doctorate (Dr. rer. nat.) at Paderborn in 2000. Her dissertation, Time-Frequency Analysis on Locally Compact Groups, was supervised by Eberhard Kaniuth.

From 2000 to 2008 she held short term positions at Paderborn University, the Georgia Institute of Technology, the University of Giessen, Washington University in St. Louis, Princeton University, Stanford University, and Yale University. In 2006 she earned her habilitation in Giessen, in 2008 she became a full professor at Osnabrück University, and in 2011 she was given the Einstein Chair at the Technical University of Berlin. In 2018 she added courtesy affiliations with computer science and electrical engineering at TU Berlin. In October 2020 she moved to the Ludwig Maximilian University of Munich, where she holds a Bavarian AI Chair.

Since taking her position in Berlin she has also visited ETH Zürich, and taken an adjunct faculty position at the University of Tromsø.

Honors and awards
Kutyniok became a member of the Berlin-Brandenburg Academy of Sciences and Humanities in 2016.
In 2019 she was named a SIAM Fellow "for contributions to applied harmonic analysis, compressed sensing, and imaging sciences".

She was the Emmy-Noether Lecturer of the German Mathematical Society in 2013, and has been selected as a plenary speaker at the eighth European Congress of Mathematics, in 2020. In 2021 she was elected Vice President-at-Large for SIAM with term running 1 January 2022 - 31 December 2023.

Books

References

External links
 Home page
 

1972 births
Living people
Czech women computer scientists
21st-century German mathematicians
German women mathematicians
Paderborn University alumni
Academic staff of Osnabrück University
Academic staff of the Technical University of Berlin
Washington University in St. Louis mathematicians
People from Detmold